In the Company of Angels II: The World Will Sing is the seventh major release from Caedmon's Call. It was released on March 7, 2006 through Essential Records.

Background 

In 2001 acoustic folk/pop group Caedmon's Call released In The Company of Angels: A Call to Worship. The album was celebrated as one of the best selling titles in the Caedmon's catalog, scanning 250,000 units to date. Caedmon's followed up with In the Company Of Angels 2: The World Will Sing featuring a blend of familiar praise and worship choruses, along with original songs written by the band. To this day the members of Caedmon’s Call have remained active in their home churches, this project takes that experience to a national platform. While In the Company of Angels: A Call to Worship focused on a local community of believers, In the Company of Angels 2: The World Will Sing illustrates the band's heart for sharing and ministering to the rest of the world.

Track listing 

 "Great and Mighty" - 4:07 (Aaron Senseman, Cliff Young, Joshua Moore)
 "Draw Me Nearer" - 4:18 (Fanny J. Crosby, Diane Sheets, Moore)
 "Sing His Love" - 3:24 (Francis P. Jones, Andrew Osenga)
 "Rest Upon Us" - 3:09 (Laura Story, Osenga)
 "The Story" - 4:01 (Osenga)
 "The Fountain" - 3:06 (Moore)
 "Be Merciful to Me" - 3:33 (Randall Goodgame, Henry Baker)
 "I Surrender All" - 3:54 (Judson W. Van DeVenter, Moore)
 "We Give Thanks" - 3:31 (Osenga)
 "Fellowship So Deep" - 4:22 (Senseman, Kinley Lange)
 "Let Me Be" - 4:29 (Senseman)

Personnel 

Band members
 Jeff Miller - bass
 Todd Bragg - drums
 Joshua Moore - piano, Hammond B-3
 Cliff Young - guitar, vocals
 Garett Buell - percussion
 Danielle young - vocals
 Andrew Osenga - guitar, vocals

Guest musicians
 Matt Odmark - background vocals
 Randall Goodgame - piano
 Michelle Avery - background vocals
 Alison Osenga - background vocals
 Aaron Senseman - background vocals, electric guitar
 Brandon Whiteside - background vocals

Technical credits
 David Grant - engineer
 Robert Beeson - executive producer
 Bob Boyd - producer, engineer, mastering
 Tim Parker - art direction
 Ron Roark - graphic design, art direction
 Jordyn Conner - executive producer
 Taylor Lee - engineer
 Andrew Osenga - engineer
 Brandon Whiteside - engineer

References

External links
In The Company of Angels II

Caedmon's Call albums
2006 albums
Essential Records (Christian) albums